Vladimir Parpura, MD, PhD (b.1964)  is a Croatian-American neurobiologist who is currently a professor at the University of Alabama at Birmingham and an elected fellow of the American Association for the Advancement of Science.

Early life and education
Parpura was born was born December 5, 1964 in Split, Croatia. Following compulsory military service, he earned his M.D. at University of Zagreb in 1989, and later was awarded a doctorate in neurology and zoology at Iowa State University in 1993.

Career and research 
He taught at Iowa State University, and then in 2000 took a teaching position at University of California, Riverside.  In July 2007, he accepted a position at the University of Alabama at Birmingham.

He was elected Member of Academia Europaea in 2012 and of Dana Alliance for Brain Initiatives in 2016.

His interests are in ion channels, astrocyte-neuron glutamate-mediated signaling, synaptic function and Glial biology. His highest cited paper is "Tripartite synapses: glia, the unacknowledged partner" at 1662 times, according to Google Scholar.

Selected publications
Vladimir Parpura, Trent A Basarsky, Fang Liu, Ksenija Jeftinija, Srdija Jeftinija, Philip G Haydon. Glutamate-mediated astrocyte–neuron signalling. 369:6483. 744–747. Nature. 1994.
Hui Hu, Yingchun Ni, Vedrana Montana, Robert C Haddon, Vladimir Parpura. Chemically functionalized carbon nanotubes as substrates for neuronal growth. 4:3. 507–511. Nano letters. 2004.
Vladimir Parpura, Philip G Haydon. Physiological astrocytic calcium levels stimulate glutamate release to modulate adjacent neurons. 97:15. 8629–8634. Proceedings of the National Academy of Sciences. 2000.
Alfonso Araque, Vladimir Parpura, Rita P Sanzgiri, Philip G Haydon. Glutamate‐dependent astrocyte modulation of synaptic transmission between cultured hippocampal neurons. 10:6. 2129:2142. European Journal of Neuroscience. 1998

References

External links
Vladimir Parpura - Search Results - PubMed

Living people
Fellows of the American Association for the Advancement of Science
Croatian biologists
University of Alabama at Birmingham faculty
Iowa State University faculty
Iowa State University alumni
Members of Academia Europaea
University of Zagreb alumni
1964 births
Scientists from Split, Croatia
University of California, Riverside faculty
Croatian emigrants to the United States